This is a list of films which placed number one at the weekend box office for the year 2018.

Number-one films

Highest-grossing films

Calendar Gross
Highest-grossing films of 2018 by Calendar Gross

In-Year Release

See also
 List of American films — American films by year
 Lists of box office number-one films

References

Chronology

2018
2018 in American cinema
United States